Cryptoblepharus boutonii, also known commonly as Bouton's snake-eyed skink, Bouton's skink, and the snake-eyed skink, is a species of lizard in the family Scincidae. The species is endemic to Mauritius, including nearby islets.

Etymology
The specific name, boutonii, is in honor of French botanist Louis Sulpice Bouton.

Habitat

Description
C. boultonii may attain a snout-to-vent length (SVL) of almost , and a tail length slightly greater than SVL.

Diet
C. boutonii preys upon small species of insects, crustaceans, and fishes.

Reproduction
C. boutonii is oviparous. Clutch size is two eggs.

References

Further reading
Desjardins J (1831). "Sur trois espèces de Lézard du genre Scinque, qui habitent l'île Maurice (Ile-de-France)". Annales des Sciences Naturelles, Paris 22: 292–299. (Scincus boutonii, new species, pp. 298–299). (in French and Latin).

Cryptoblepharus
Reptiles described in 1831
Taxa named by Julien Desjardins